The 8th Dalmatian Shock Corps was a corps of the Yugoslav Partisans formed on 7 October 1943. It was formed from the 9th, 19th, 20th, and 26th Dalmatian divisions, and was named after the region of Dalmatia. Upon creation it had 13,049 soldiers. The corps operated in the Independent State of Croatia, Governorate of Dalmatia, and Adriatic Littoral, where they fought Italians, Chetniks, the Ustaše, and Germans.

On 30 November 1944 the 8th Dalmatian Corps, without the military command, had 34,548 soldiers, out of which 25,127 were Croats, 4,806 Serbs, 236 Muslims, 61 Jews, and 4,318 others, mostly Slovenes and Montenegrins. In February 1945 Corps numbered over 45,000 fighters, of which about 70% were Croats and the other 30% were
Serbs, Muslims, Slovenes, Montenegrins, Italians and others.

The 8th Corps participated in the liberation of Dalmatia, Herzegovina, western Bosnia, Istria, Kvarner, Lika, Slovenian Littoral, and Trieste. Upon liberation of Knin in December 1944, the corps was named Udarni ('shock'), while the 1st, 2nd, and 3rd Dalmatian Strike Brigades received the Order of the People's Hero. On 2 March 1945 the corps became part of the 4th Army of the Yugoslav Partisans, together with the 7th and 11th Corps, while having 45,524 soldiers. On 20 March 1945, the Dalmatian divisions began a great battle from Lika to Soča, this offensive was in area long over 300 kilometers. In this military operation the 8th Dalmatian Corps had about 5,000 dead and over 15,000 wounded fighters. The enemy from this corps suffered heavy losses of about 100,000 dead and captured. The 8th Corps gave great contribution for liberation Croatia, parts of Bosnia and Herzegovina and Slovenia. Josip Broz Tito on 13 September 1953, in Split said that this corps "has played historical role in history of our People's Liberation War, that is why he deserves gratitude and recognition"

Notes

References
 

Corps of the Yugoslav Partisans
Military units and formations established in 1943
Military units and formations disestablished in 1945